Insects have long been used in medicine, both traditional and modern, sometimes with little evidence of their effectiveness. For the purpose of the article, and in line with custom, medicinal uses of other arthropods such as spiders are included.

Traditional and alternative uses

The medicinal uses of insects and other arthropods worldwide have been reviewed by Meyer-Rochow, who provides examples of all major insect groups, spiders, worms and molluscs and discusses their potential as suppliers of bioactive components. Using insects (and spiders) to treat various maladies and injuries has a long tradition and, having stood the test of time, can be effective and provide results. However, sometimes folk-medicinal "logic" was based on the Doctrine of Signatures = "let likes be cured by likes"and had, if any at all, little more than a psychological effect. For example, to treat cases of constipation, dung beetles were prescribed; to slim down stick insects were thought to help; hairy tarantulas seemed the right treatment for hair loss and fat grubs resembling the swollen limb caused by the parasite Wuchereria bancrofti were expected to help the elephantiasis patient. An organism bearing parts that resemble human body parts, animals, or other objects, was thought to have useful relevance to those parts, animals or objects.  So, for example, the femurs of grasshoppers, which were said to resemble the human liver, were used to treat liver ailments by the indigenous peoples of Mexico.  This doctrine is common throughout traditional and alternative medicine, but is most prominent where medical traditions are broadly accepted, as in traditional Chinese medicine and Ayurveda, and less by community and family based medicine, as is more common in parts of Africa.

Traditional Chinese medicine

Traditional Chinese medicine includes the use of herbal medicine, acupuncture, massage, exercise, and dietary therapy.  It is a typical component of modern medical care throughout East Asia and in some parts of Southeast Asia (such as Thailand).  Insects are very commonly incorporated as part of the herbal medicine component of traditional Chinese medicine, and their medical properties and applications are broadly accepted and agreed upon.  Some brief examples follow:

The Chinese Black Mountain Ant, Polyrhachis vicina, is supposed to act as a cure all and is widely used, especially by the elderly.  It is said to prolong life, to have anti-aging properties, to replenish Qi, and to increase virility and fertility. Recent interest in the ants' medicinal qualities has led to British researchers to study the extract's potential to serve as a cancer-fighting agent.  Chinese Black Mountain Ant extract is typically consumed mixed with wine.

India and Ayurveda

Ayurveda is ancient traditional Indian treatment almost universally incorporated alongside Western medicine as a typical component of medical treatment in India.  Although Ayurvedic medicine is often effective, doses can be inconsistent, and may sometimes be contaminated with toxic heavy metals.  Some brief examples to follow:

Termite is said to cure a variety of diseases, both specific and vague.  Typically the mound or a portion of the mound is dug up and the termites and the architectural components of the mound are together ground into a paste which is then applied topically to the affected areas or, more rarely, mixed with water and consumed.  This treatment was said to cure ulcers, rheumatic diseases, and anemia.  It was also suggested to be a general pain reliever and health improver.

The Jatropha Leaf Miner, a lepidopteran which feeds preferentially on Jatropha, is an example of a major insect agricultural pest which is also a medicinal remedy.  The larvae, which are also the form of the insect with the greatest economic impact on agriculture, are harvested, boiled, and mashed into a paste which is administered topically and is said to induce lactation, reduce fever, and soothe gastrointestinal tracts.

Africa

Unlike China and India, the traditional insect medicine of Africa is extremely variable.  It is largely regional, with few, if any, major agreements on which insects are useful as treatments for which ailments.  Most insect medicinal treatments are passed on through communities and families, rather than being taught in university settings, as Traditional Chinese Medicine and Ayurveda sometimes are; furthermore, most traditional medicine practices necessitate a person in a "healer" role.  Some brief examples to follow:

Grasshopper is both commonly eaten as a delicacy and an excellent source of protein and is consumed for medicinal purposes.  These insects are typically collected, dried in the sun, and then ground into a powder.  The powder can then be turned into a paste when mixed with water and ash and applied to the forehead to alleviate the pain of violent headaches.  Additionally, the headaches themselves can be prevented by a "healer"  inserting the paste under the skin at the nape of the affected person's neck.

Termites are also used in parts of Africa much like they are in India.  Parts of the mound are dug up, boiled, and turned into a paste, which can then be applied to external wounds to prevent infection or consumed to treat internal hemorrhages.  termites are used not only as a form of medicine, but also as a medical device.  If a "healer" wants to insert a medicine subcutaneously, they will often spread that medicine on the skin of the patient, and then agitate a termite and place the insect on the skin of the patient.  When the termite bites, its mandibles effectively serve as an injection device.

Americas

The Americas were more highly influenced by the Doctrine of Signatures than China, India, or Africa, most likely because of their colonial history with Europe. The majority of insect use in medicine is associated with Central America and parts of South America, rather than North America, and most of it is based on the medical techniques of indigenous peoples.  Currently, insect medicine is practiced much more rarely than in China, India, or Africa, though it is still relatively common in rural areas with large indigenous populations.  Some examples to follow:

Chapulines, or grasshoppers, are commonly consumed as a toasted regional dish in some parts of Mexico, but they are also used medicinally.  They are said to serve as diuretic to treat kidney diseases, to reduce swelling, and to relieve the pain of intestinal disorders when they are consumed.  However, there are some risks associated with consuming chapulines, as they are known to harbor nematodes which may be transmitted to humans upon consumption.

Much like the termites of Africa, ants were sometimes used as medicinal devices by the indigenous peoples of Central America.  The soldier cast of the Army ant would be collected and used as living sutures by Mayans. This involved agitating an ant and holding its mandibles up to the wound edges; when it bit down, the thorax and abdomen were removed, leaving the head holding the wound together.  The ant's salivary gland secretions were reputed to have antibiotic properties. The venom of the Red harvester ant was used to treat rheumatism, arthritis, and poliomyelitis via the immunological reaction produced by its sting.  This technique, in which ants are allowed to sting affected areas in a controlled manner, is still used in some arid rural areas of Mexico.

The silkworm, Bombyx mori, was also commonly consumed both as a regional food and for medicinal purposes in Central America after it was brought to the New World by the Spanish and Portuguese.  Only the immatures are consumed.  Boiled pupae were eaten to treat apoplexy, aphasy, bronchitis, pneumonia, convulsions, hemorrhages, and frequent urination.  The excrement produced by the larvae is also eaten to improve circulation and alleviate the symptoms of cholera (intense vomiting and diarrhea).

Honey bee products

Honey bee products are used medicinally across Asia, Europe, Africa, Australia, and the Americas, despite the fact that the honey bee was not introduced to the Americas until the colonization by Spain and Portugal.  They are by far the most common medical insect product, both historically and currently.

Honey is the most frequently referenced medical bee material.  It can be applied to skin to treat excessive scar tissue, rashes, and burns, and can be applied as a poultice to eyes to treat infection.  It is also consumed for digestive problems and as a general health restorative, and can be heated and consumed to treat head colds, cough, throat infections, laryngitis, tuberculosis, and lung diseases.

Additionally, apitoxin, or honey bee venom, can be applied via direct stings to relieve arthritis, rheumatism, polyneuritis, and asthma.  Propolis, a resinous, waxy mixture collected by honeybees and used as a hive insulator and sealant, is often consumed by menopausal women because of its high hormone content, and it is said to have antibiotic, anesthetic, and anti-inflammatory properties.  Royal jelly is used to treat anemia, gastrointestinal ulcers, arteriosclerosis, hypo- and hypertension, and inhibition of sexual libido.  Finally Bee bread, or bee pollen, is eaten as a generally health restorative, and is said to help treat both internal and external infections.  All of these honey bee products are regularly produced and sold, especially online and in health food stores, though none are yet approved by the FDA.

Modern scientific uses

Though insects were widely used throughout history for medical treatment on nearly every continent, relatively little medical entomological research has been conducted since the revolutionary advent of antibiotics.  Heavy reliance on antibiotics, coupled with discomfort with insects in Western culture limited the field of insect pharmacology until the rise of antibiotic resistant infections sparked pharmaceutical research to explore new resources.  Arthropods represent a rich and largely unexplored source of new medicinal compounds.

Maggot therapy

Maggot therapy is the intentional introduction of live, disinfected blow fly larvae (maggots) into soft tissue wounds to selectively clean out the necrotic tissue. This helps to prevent infection; it also speeds healing of chronically infected wounds and ulcers. Military surgeons since classical antiquity noticed that wounds which had been left untreated for several days, and which had become infested with maggots, healed better than wounds not so infested. Maggots secrete several chemicals that kill microbes, including allantoin, urea, phenylacetic acid, phenylacetaldehyde, calcium carbonate, proteolytic enzymes, and many others.

Maggots were used for wound healing by the Maya and by indigenous Australians. More recently, they were used in Renaissance Europe, in the Napoleonic Wars, the American Civil War, and in the First and Second World Wars. It continues to be used in military medicine.

Apitherapy

Apitherapy is the medical use of honeybee products such as honey, pollen, bee bread, propolis, royal jelly and bee venom.  One of the major peptides in bee venom, called Melittin, has the potential to treat inflammation in people who have Rheumatoid arthritis or Multiple sclerosis. Melittin blocks the expression of inflammatory genes, thus reducing swelling and pain. It is administered by direct insect sting, or intramuscular injections.  Bee products demonstrate a wide array of antimicrobial factors and in laboratory studies and have been shown to kill antibiotic resistant bacteria, pancreatic cancer cells, and many other infectious microbes.

Blister beetle and Spanish fly

Spanish fly is an emerald-green beetle, Lytta vesicatoria, in the blister beetle family (Meloidae). It and other such species were used in preparations offered by traditional apothecaries.  The insect is the source of the terpenoid cantharidin, a toxic blistering agent once used as an aphrodisiac.

Blood-feeding insects

Many blood-feeding insects like ticks, horseflies, and mosquitoes inject multiple bioactive compounds into their prey.  These insects have been used by practitioners of Eastern Medicine for hundreds of years to prevent blood clot formation or thrombosis.  However, modern medical research has only recently begun to investigate the drug development potential of blood-feeding insect saliva.  These compounds in the saliva of blood feeding insects are capable of increasing the ease of blood feeding by preventing coagulation of platelets around the wound and provide protection against the host's immune response.  Currently, over 1280 different protein families have been associated with the saliva of blood feeding organisms. This diverse range of compounds may include:

inhibitors of platelet aggregation, ADP, arachidonic acid, thrombin, and PAF.
anticoagulants
vasodilators
vasoconstrictors
antihistamines
sodium channel blockers
complement inhibitors
pore formers
inhibitors of angiogenesis
anaesthetics 
AMPs and microbial pattern recognition molecules.
Parasite enhancers/activators

Currently, some preliminary progress has been made with investigation of the therapeutic properties of tick anticoagulant peptide (TAP) and Ixolaris a novel recombinant tissue factor pathway inhibitor (TFPI) from the salivary gland of the tick, Ixodes scapularis.  Additionally, Ixolaris, a tissue factor inhibitor has been shown to block primary tumor growth and angiogenesis in a glioblastoma model.   Despite the strong potential of these compounds for use as anticoagulants or immunomodulating drugs no modern medicines, developed from the saliva of blood-sucking insects, are currently on the market.

Arachnids

Like plants and insects, arachnids have also been used for thousands of years in traditional medical practices.  Recent scientific research in natural bioactive factors has increased, leading to a renewed interest in venom components in many animals.  In 1993 Margatoxin was synthesized from the venom of the Centruroides margaritatus the Central American bark scorpion. It is a peptide that selectively inhibits voltage-dependent potassium channels.  Patented by Merck, it has the potential to prevent neointimal hyperplasia, a common cause of bypass graft failure.

In addition to medical uses of arachnid defense compounds, a great amount of research has recently been directed toward the synthesis and use of spider silk as a scaffolding for ligament generation.  Spider silk is an ideal material for the synthesis of medical skin grafts or ligament implants because it is one of the strongest known natural fibers and triggers little immune response in animals. Spider silk may also be used to make fine sutures for stitching nerves or eyes to heal with little scarring.  Medical uses of spider silk is not a new idea. Spider silks have been used for thousands of years to fight infection and heal wounds.  Efforts to produce industrial quantities and qualities of spider silk in transgenic goat milk are underway.

Psychoactive scorpions

Recent news reports claim that use of scorpions for psychoactive purposes is gaining in popularity in Asia.  Heroin addicts in Afghanistan are purported to smoke dried scorpions or use scorpion stings to get high when heroin is not available.  The use of scorpions as a psychoactive drug reportedly gives an instant high as strong or stronger than heroin. However, there is little information on the long-term effects of using scorpion toxins. The 'scorpion sting craze' has also increased in India with a decreasing availability of other drugs and alcohol available to youth.  Young people are reportedly flocking to highway sides where they can purchase scorpion stings that after several minutes of intense pain, supposedly produce a six- to eight-hour feeling of wellbeing.

References

Ethnology
Entomology
Traditional medicine
Insects in culture